Ricardo Capuano (23 June 1971 – 16 August 2022), better known as Rico, was a Scottish rock singer-songwriter.

Biography
Capuano was born in Paisley in 1971. He was the singer with the band Perfect World in the mid-1990s. Record company interest did not translate into a record deal, and he later went solo, recording as simply Rico.

His debut album Sanctuary Medicines was released by EMI/Chrysalis in 1999, and was described by the Glasgow Evening Times as being "as black as it was intense". He supported Gary Numan on his UK tour in 2003, and had a hit with Numan in 2003 with "Crazier", which reached number 13 on the UK Singles Chart. Second album Violent Silences was released in 2004, and featured collaborations with Numan and Tricky.

Capuano produced a project by the band LUNG; a French/British duo with singer-guitarist Chris Loung and drummer-programmer Ric Chandler. The album, LUNG, was released in February 2013 on the American label octopus wreckords.

Capuano died in Govan, Glasgow on 16 August 2022. His death was announced by friend and collaborator Gary Numan.

Behind The Noise 
Starting in 2011, Rico was involved in Behind The Noise, a Glasgow-based music business education programme. The programme took young people through the music industry, including recording, production, promotion and live gigs at the Classic Grand. The project stopped running in 2019 after they were unable to secure funding.

Discography

Albums
 Sanctuary Medicines (1999), EMI/Chrysalis
 Violent Silences (2004), Manufactured/Artful

References

External links 
 
 MySpace Page

1971 births
2022 deaths
20th-century Scottish male singers
21st-century Scottish male singers
British male singer-songwriters
Scottish rock musicians
Scottish singer-songwriters
Musicians from Glasgow